The electoral district of Mount Morgan was a Legislative Assembly electorate in the state of Queensland, Australia, centred on the town of Mount Morgan.

History
Mount Morgan was created by the Electoral Districts Act of 1911, taking effect at the 1912 state election, and existed until the 1932 state election. It was based on the former electorates of Logan and Maree.

When Mount Morgan was abolished in 1932, its area was incorporated into the electoral district of Fitzroy.

Members

The following people were elected in the seat of Mount Morgan:

Crawford previously represented Fitzroy (1909–1912).
Stopford subsequently represented Maryborough (1932–1936).

References

Former electoral districts of Queensland
1912 establishments in Australia
1932 disestablishments in Australia
Constituencies established in 1912
Constituencies disestablished in 1932